Klejdi Bardhyl Dibra (born 16 July 1992 in Shkodër) is an Albanian footballer who currently plays as a defender for Burreli in Kategoria e Parë.

References

1992 births
Living people
Footballers from Shkodër
Albanian footballers
Association football defenders
KF Vllaznia Shkodër players
KF Tërbuni Pukë players
Besëlidhja Lezhë players
KS Burreli players
Kategoria e Parë players
Kategoria Superiore players